The Peoples Choice: Favorite International Artist is a defunct award, formerly presented at the MuchMusic Video Awards. The award was only presented to an artist or group that was not from Canada. For the 2008 MuchMusic Video Awards, the award was changed to People's Choice: Favourite International Video, a more general award including international group artists as well as international solo artists.

Winners

MuchMusic Video Awards